Maxime Elmaleh (born May 5, 1969) is a Canadian curler.

Teams

Men's

Mixed

Personal life
Maxime Elmaleh attended Cégep de Lévis-Lauzon. He works as accounting supervisor at CDPQ Inc.

References

External links
 
 Maxime Elmaleh – Curling Canada Stats Archive
 Male Athlete of the Week: Maxime Elmaleh | Curling Canada (December 1, 2010)

Living people
1969 births
Curlers from Quebec
Sportspeople from Quebec City
Canadian male curlers
Brier champions
Continental Cup of Curling participants
Canada Cup (curling) participants